In the U.S. state of Nevada, U.S. Route 95 Alternate (US 95 Alt., sometimes referred to as US 95A) is an alternate route of U.S. Route 95 located in the western part of the state.  It connects Schurz to Interstate 80 via the cities of Yerington and Fernley.

The highway is one of three routes in Nevada that has existed as US 95 Alt.

Route description
The present US 95 Alt. begins at its junction with US 95 in Schurz and runs west to Yerington. From there, it runs north to Silver Springs (located at the junction with US 50 and Alternate US 50), then continues north to Fernley. Alternate US 95 is routed concurrently with Alternate US 50 from Silver Springs to Fernley.

Nevada’s official highway log lists the northern termination of the route at its junction with I-80 at Fernley. However, maps, including Nevada’s own official state maps, show the route continuing northeast along I-80 to its junction with mainline US 95 at exit 83.

History
Dates are based on when changes appear on official Nevada state highway maps unless otherwise noted.

The present US 95 Alt. was commissioned in 1941. It ran from its current southern terminus at Schurz to the junction with US 40 and US 95 at Fernley. However, it was displayed on the official 1941 Nevada highway map as US 95, making it appear as if there were two different highways with the same number. The error was corrected on the 1942 map. Alternate US 95 replaced part of SR 3 between Schurz and Yerington; SR 2B from Yerington to present-day Fort Churchill Road, south of Silver Springs; and State Route 1B from Fort Churchill Road to Fernley.

A second US 95 Alt. was created in 1960 due a realignment of mainline US 95. Mainline US 95 was extended due north from Fallon to US 40 over the former SR 1A. The former route of US 95 via Fernley was renumbered as Alternate US 95. Strangely, this placed two different routes numbered as US 95 Alt. in the same area of Nevada with the two meeting at Fernley. This lasted until around 1978, when the route from Fallon to Fernley was renumbered as US 50 Alt., except for the easternmost nine miles (14 km); they had been concurrently numbered as US 50 and retained that number.

Major intersections

Note: Mileposts in Nevada reset at county lines; the start and end mileposts for each county are given in the county column.  Mileposts are given only for those portions of Alternate US 95 not concurrent with Interstate 80.

See also

Notes

References

External links

95 Alternate (Schurz–Fernley, Nevada)
95 Alternate (Schurz–Fernley)
Alternate (Schurz–Fernley, Nevada)
Transportation in Mineral County, Nevada
Transportation in Lyon County, Nevada
Transportation in Churchill County, Nevada